Todd Howarth (born 25 January 1982) is an Australian footballer. He currently plays for Fremantle City.

Club career

Early career
Howarth started his career at Football West Premier League outfit Perth SC.

Perth Glory
On 7 August 2009 he was signed to his first professional contract by Perth Glory after having trialled for a few weeks. On the same day he made his debut for Perth Glory as a substitute, in a 1–0 defeat to Adelaide United. On 27 April 2012, Howarth was released by Perth Glory.

Persib Bandung
In November 2012, Howarth nearly joined the Indonesia Super League club Persib Bandung, but after a very tough contract negotiations Persib decided to stop negotiating with him.

A-League career statistics 
(Correct as of 28 April 2012)

References

External links
 Perth Glory profile

1982 births
Association football midfielders
A-League Men players
Australian soccer players
Living people
Perth Glory FC players